This is a list of Sheriffs of Monmouthshire, an office which was created in 1536 but not fully settled until 1540.

On 1 April 1974, under the provisions of the Local Government Act 1972, the shrievalty of Monmouthshire was abolished, and replaced by the new office of High Sheriff of Gwent, covering a broadly similar area.

List of Sheriffs

Served under Henry VIII

1540–41: Charles Herbert, of Troy House First High Sheriff
1541–42: Walter Herbert, of St. Julian's
1542–43: Walter ap Robert, of Pantglas
1543–44: Henry Lewis, of St. Pierre

Served under Edward VI
1544–45: Reynold ap Howel, of Perth-hir House
1545–46: John Harry Lewis, of Mathern
1546–47: Anthony Walsh, of Llanwern
1547–48: Thomas ap Morgan, of Pencoed
1548–49: Sir Charles Herbert, Kt. of Troy House
1549–50: Sir William Morgan, Kt. of Tredegar
1550–51: Walter Herbert, of St. Julian's (died in office and replaced by his son William Herbert
1551–52: William Herbert, of Coldbrook
1552–53: William Herbert, of St. Julian's

Served under Queen Mary I

1553–54: Anthony Walsh, of Llanwern
1554–55: Walter ap Robert, of Pantglas
1555–56: William John Thomas, of Treowen
1556–57: Rowland Morgan, of Machen
1557–58: Henry Lewis, of Mathern

Served under Queen Elizabeth I

1558–59: Sir Thomas Morgan (or ap Morgan), Kt. of Pencoed
1559–60: Thomas Herbert, of Wonastow
1560–61: George James, of Troy
1561–62: Roger Williams, of Llangibby
1562–63: William Herbert, of Coldbrook
1563–64: William Herbert, of St. Julian's
1564–65: Sir William Morgan, Kt. of Tredegar
1565–66: John Henry Kemys, of Westgate House, Newport
1566–67: William ap John ap Rogers of Abergavenny
1567–68: William Morgan, of Llantarnam Abbey
1568–69: Christopher Walsh, of Llanwern
1569–70: Roland Morgan, of Llanvedon
1570–71: William Herbert, of Coldbrook
1571–72: Thomas Herbert, of Wonastow
1572–73: William Morgan, of Llantarnam Abbey
1573–74: Miles Morgan, of Tredegar
1574–75: Roland Kemys, of Vaendare
1575–76: Christopher Walsh, of Llanwern
1576–77: Rice Morgan, address unknown
1577–78: William John ap Roger, of Abergavenny
1578–79: William Lewis, of St. Pierre
1579–80: Sir William Herbert, Knt. of St. Julian's
1580–81: Thomas Morgan, of Machen
1581–82: Edmund Morgan, of Pencarn
1582–83: Edward Morgan, of Llantarnam Abbey
1583–84: Matthew Herbert, of Coldbrook
1584–85: William Lewes, of Abergavenny
1585–86: Rhys Morgan, address unknown
1586–87: John Jones, of Treowen
1587–88: Henry Morgan, of Penllwyn
1588–89: Henry Herbert (or Harbarte), of Wonastow
1589–90: Nicholas Harberte (or Harbarte), of Wonastow
1590–91: Edward Kemys, the Van of Kemys
1591–92: Walter Vaughn, of Cockhill
1592–93: Roland Morgan, of Bedwellty
1593–94: Walter Jones, of Magor
1594–95: Matthew Herbert, of Coldbrook
1595–96: Matthew Pritchard, of Llanvair
1596–97: Andrew Morgan, of Llanfihangel
1597–Jan 1598:Henry Herbert (died in Office)
1598–99: Henry Billingsly, of Penhow
1599–1600: Rhys Kemeys, of Kemeys
1600–01: Edward Kemeys, of Kemeys
1601–02: Edmund Morgan, of Llanternam

Served under James I

1602–03: Henry Morgan, of Penllwyn
1603–04: John Gaynesford, address unknown
1604–05: Roland Williams, of Llangibby
1605–06: Valentine Prichard, address unknown
1606–07: William Price, of Llanffoyst
1607–08: Sir Walter Montagu, Knt. of Penycoed
1608–09: Charles Jones (afterwards Sir Charles Jones), Knt. of Dingestow
1609–10: Henry Lewes, of St. Pierre
1610–11: William Rowlins, of Tregaer
1611–12: Sir William Morgan of Tredegar
1612–13: Roger Botherne, of Penhow
1613–14: Giles Morgan, of Pencoug
1614–15: William Jones, of Treowen
1615–16: Thomas Vaun, of Coldra
1616–17: Thomas Morgan (afterwards Sir Thomas Morgan), of Rhywperra
1617–18: George Milborne, of Wonastow
1618–19: William Hughes, of Cillwch
1619–20: Thomas Cocke, address unknown
1620–21: Walter Aldey, of Chepstow Hardwick
1621–22: Robert Jones, of Grandra
1622–23: William Walter, of Persfield
1623–24: David Lewis, of Llandewi

Served under Charles I

1624–25: Edward Morgan, address unknown
1625–26: Charles Somerset, of Troy
1626–27: Sir Charles Williams of Llangibby
1627–28: William Kemys (or Kymies, or Kemeys), of Kemys
1628–29: William Thomas, of Carlion
1629–30: John Walter, of Persfield
1630–31: William Barker, of Abergavenny
1631–32: Nicholas Kemeys of Llanvair
1632–33: Nicholas Arnold of Llanvihangel Crugcornen
1633–34: Lewis Van (or Vaune), of Coldra
1634–35: George Milborne, of Wonastow
1635–36: Henry Probert, of Pant glas
1636–37: Thomas Morgan, of Tymawr
1637–38: William Herbert, of Coldbrook
1638–39: Nicholas Moore, of Crick
1639–40: John Milborne, address unknown
1640–41: Edmund Morgan, address unknown
1641–42: Edmund Morgan, address unknown
1641–42: Thomas Morgan, of Llanfon
1642–43: Phillip Jones, of Treowen
1643–44: Thomas Price, of Llanffoyet
1644–45: Sir Edward Morgan, of Pencoyd
1645–46: William Herbert, address unknown
1646–47: William Morgan, of Pencrigge
1647–48: Henry Vaughn, of Caldicot

Served under Oliver Cromwell, Protector

1648–49: Christopher Catchway (or Katchway) Esq., address unknown
1650: Roger Williams, of Newport
1651: Thomas Williams, address unknown
1652: William Blethin Esq., address unknown
1653: Edward Kemis, of Bartholey
1654: Henry Barker Esq., address unknown
1655: John Price, Esq., address unknown
1656: Charles Herbert, of Hadrock
1657: Roger Oates, of Cefntilla
1658–59: Charles Vaun, of Coldra. Charles Vaun's appointment of Thomas Powell as under sheriff, dated 23 December 1658, recites that he had been appointed High Sheriff by the Lord Protector, of course for the year ensuing whence it seems he served two years in succession.
1660: Charles Vaun, of Coldra. Charles Vaun transferred prisoners to his successor Thomas Morgan, by deed dated 16 January 1661, indicating that he may have served a third term.

Served under Charles II
1661: Thomas Morgan of Machen
1662: William Jones
1663: George Dwynne
1664: Roger Williams
1665: Philip Cecil of Dyffryn
12 November 1665: Walter Morgan, of Llandeilo Patholly
7 November 1666: John Arnold, of Llanvihangel Court
15 November 1666: Christopher Perkins, of Pilston
6 November 1667: William Herbert, of Coldbrook
6 November 1668: John Arnold, of Llanvihangel Court
11 November 1669: Sir John Scudamore, 2nd Baronet, of Ballingham
4 November 1670: Roger Oates, of Cefntilla
9 November 1671: Philip Jones, of Llinarth
11 November 1672: Thomas Herbert, of Usk
12 November 1673: John Walter, of Piercefield
5 November 1674: John Gwynn, of Llangoun
15 November 1675: Rowland Prichard
10 November 1676: John Loof
15 November 1677: William Kemeys, of Kemeys
14 November 1678: James Herbert, of Coldbrook
13 November 1679: Thomas Morgan, of Penros
4 November 1680: William Jones, of Lanerissey or Abergavenny
1682: Edward Nicholls of Tre-llech
1683: John Gabb of Grosmont
1684: Walter Evans

Served under James II 
1685: Robert Gunter of Abergavenny
1686: Nicholas Jones of Magor
1687: Richard Roberts
1688: Philip Jones of Llanarth
1689: Henry Probert of The Argoed, Penallt

Served under William III and Mary
1689: Thomas Morgan of Tredegar
1690: Charles Price of Llanfoist
1691: David Evans
1692: Edward Fielding of Tintern Parva
1693: John Floyer of Llantilio Perth-oleu
1694: Thomas Jones 
1695: George Kemeys of Kemeys replaced by Henry Tomkins of Caerleon

Served under William III
1696: Edward Perkyns of Pilston
1697: John Morgan of Machen 
1698: George Lewis of Pen-how
1699: George Kemeys of Kemeys
1699: William Blevin
1700: Edmund Morgan of Pen-llwyn
1701: Thomas Morgan of ?Llacrumiiey

Served under Anne
1702: William Lewis of Tre-worgen and Llanddewi Rhydderch
1703: David Lloyd of Hendre
1704: Lewis Morgan of Penylan
1705: Thomas Evans of Llangattwg Vibonavel
1706: John Carre of Rogerston Grange
1707: Vere Herbert of Caldecot
1708: John Springet of Grosmont
1709: David Lewis
1710: Christopher Perkyns of Pilstone
1711: Thomas Price of Llanfoist
1712: Giles Meredith of Llanelen
1713: John Walter of Persfield

Served under George I
1714: John Walter of Bersfield
1715: Christopher Price of Llanfoist
1716: William Jones of Usk Priory
1717: James Hughes of Gelli-wig
1718: Charles Van, of Llanwern
1719: Laurence Lord
1720: Edward Thomas
1721: Charles Probert of Tre-llech
1722: Henry Morgan of Bedwellty
1723: John Jones of Pant-y-goetre
1724: Matthew Powell of Llantilio
1725: Morgan Morgan of Llanromney
1726: Richard Lewis of Court-y-Gallon
1727: Edward Gore of Langston

Served under George II
1728: David Miles of Llandderfel
1729: Robert Jones of Grondry
1729: Lewis Morgan of Newport replaced by John Gwynn of Langoon
1730: Henry Nash
1731: Thomas Jenkins of Goytree
1732: Edmund Bradbury
1733: William Rees of St Brides
1734: Henry Morgan, of Penlloyne
1735: Richard Lewis of Court-y-gollen
1736: William Bonner
1737: Anthony Morgan of Lanethly
1738: William Seys of Gaer, Newport
1739: Paul Morgan of Chepstow
1740: Thomas Evans of Llangattwg Vibonavel
1741: Francis Jenkins
1742: Richard Clarke of the Hill
1743: Edward Perkins of Pilstone
1744: James Tudor Morgan of Llangattock Lingoed
1745: William Aldy of Hardwicke
1746: Thomas Jenkins of Glascoed
1747: John Day of Caldicot
1748: Aubrey Barnes of Monmouth
1749: Sydenham Shipway of Caldicott
1750: Philip Fisher of Monmouth
1751: Evan Jones
1752: Thomas Parry
1753: William Jenkins of Goytree
1754: John Chambie of Lanforst
1755: John Jones of Craigwith
1756: Daniel Treagose of Tregiriog House
1757: John Lewis of Landilo
1758: Rowland Pytt
1759: William Morgan of Bryn-gwyn
1760: William Curre, of Itton

Served under George III
1761: William Phillips of Whitson
1762: John Roberts of Abergavenny
1763: Allan Lord of Kemeys
1764: William Lloyd of The Hill, Abergavenny
1765: Solomon Jones of Llantilio Pertholeu
1766: William Winsmore of Pant-y-goetre
1767: Thomas John Medlicott, of Monmouth
1768: Richard Lucas of Llangattwg, Usk
1769: George Duberley of Dingestow
1770: Charles Milbome of Wonastow
1771: Thomas Fletcher of Monmouth
1772: Thomas Fydale of Chepstow, merchant
1773: Morgan Lewis of St. Pierre
1774: James Davis of Chepstow
1775: William Nicholl of Caerleon
1776: Philip Meakins of Hardwick, Monmouth
1777: Edmund Probyn of Newland
1778: Charles Price of Llanfoist
1779: William Addams Williams of Llangibby
1780: Thomas Hooper of Pant-y-goetre
1781: William Jones of Nash, Gloucestershire
1782: Edward Thomas [place not given]
1783: Elisha Briscoe of Dixton
1784: Christopher Chambre of Llanfoist
1785: William Rees, of St. Bride's
1786: Robert Salusbury, later Sir Robert Salusbury, 1st Baronet, of Llanwern
1787: Thomas Lewis of Chepstow
1788: George Smith of Persfield 
1789: Thomas Lewis, of Saint Pierre
1790: William Dinwoody of Abergavenny
1791: William Harrison of Ton, Ragland
1792: David Tanner of Monmouth
1793: John Hanbury Williams of Coldbrook
1794: John Rolls of Dyffryn
1795: Richard Morgan of Argoed
1796: Henry Barnes of Monmouth
1797: Thomas Stoughton of Pontypool
1798: Robert Morgan Kinsey, of Abergavenny (replaced Joshua Morgan)
1799: Capel Hanbury Leigh of Pontypool
5 February 1800: Benjamin Waddington, of Llanover
17 March 1801: Thomas Williams, of Chepstow
3 February 1802: Thomas Morgan, of The Hill, Abergavenny
3 February 1803: George Jones, of Salisbury in Magor
23 April 1804: William Adams Williams, of Llangibby
6 February 1805: Joseph Price, of Monmouth
1 February 1806: William Phillips, of Whitston House
4 February 1807: William Partridge, of Monmouth
3 February 1808: William Morgan, of Mamhilad
6 February 1809: John Kemys Gardner Kemys, of Pertholey
31 January 1810: William Pilkington, of Hilston Park
8 February 1811: Hugh Powell, of Llanvihangel
24 January 1812: Charles Lewis, of St Pierre
10 February 1813: Samuel Homfray, of Penderren
4 February 1814: Sir Samuel Brudenell Fludyer, 2nd Baronet, of Trostrey
13 February 1815: Samuel Bosanquet, of Dingestow
1816: Sir Henry Protheroe of Llantarnam Abbey
1817: Robert Thompson of Tintern Abbey
1818: Nathaniel Wells, of Piercefield, the first black person to be appointed a sheriff
1819: George Buckle of Chepstow

Served under George IV
1820: Sir Robert Jones Allard Kemeys, Kt, of Malpas
1821: Charles Morgan Robinson Morgan of Tredegar
1822: James Jenkins of Chepstow
1823: Sir Joseph Bailey, 1st Baronet of Nant-y-glo
1824: John Partridge of Monmouth
1825: James Proctor of Chepstow
1826: Benjamin Hall of Abercarn
1827: William Addams Williams of Llangibby Castle
1828: William Morgan of Pant-y-Goetre
1829: Thomas Fothergill of Caerleon

Served under William IV

1830: William Jones, of Clytha Park was initially appointed but was replaced by Iltyd Nichol, of Usk
1831: William Hollis, of Mounton
1832: Sir Mark Wood, 2nd Baronet, of Rumney
1833: William Vaughan, of Courtfield
1834: John Buckle, of Mathern
1835: Charles Marriott, of Dixton
1836: George Rooke, of Llandogo
1837: Philip Jones, of Llanarth Court

Served under Queen Victoria

1838: John Jenkins, of Caerleon
1839: Colthurst Bateman, of Pertholey
1840: Summers Harford, of Sirhowy
1841: Samuel Homfray, of Bedwellty
1842: John Etherington Welch Rolls, of The Hendre
1843: Sir Digby Mackworth, 4th Baronet, of Glanusk Park
1844: William Jones, of Clytha Park
1845: William Philips, of Whitson House
1846: Thomas Prothero, of Malpas Court
1847: William Mark Wood, of Rhymney
1848: Edward Harris Phillips, of Trosnant Cottage
1849: John Arthur Edward Herbert, of Llanarth Court
1850: Crawshay Bailey, of Llanthewy Court
1851: Ferdinand Hanbury Williams, of Coldbrook Park
1852: William Hunter Little, of Llanvair Grange
1853: Henry Bailey, of Nantyglo
1854: Thomas Brown, of Ebbw Vale
1855: John Russell, of the Wyelands, Chepstow
1856: Edward Bagnall Dimmack, of Pontypool
1857: Thomas Gratrex, of Court St Lawrence
1858: Godfrey Charles Morgan, of Tredegar Park
1859: Edward Mathew Curre, of Itton Court
1860: Hon. William Powell Rodney, of Llanvihangel Court
1861: James Proctor Carruthers, of The Grondra, near Chepstow
1862: John Best Snead, of Chepstow
1863: Henry Martin Kennard, of Crumlin Hall, near Newport
1864: Henry Charles Byrde, of Goytre House
1865: Arthur Davies Berrington, of Panty-Goitre
1866: Frederick Cotton Finch Esq. of Blaenavon
1867: George Ralph Greenhow Ralph Esq. of Beech Hill
1868: Frank Johnstone Mitchell Esq. of Llanfrechfa Grange
1869: John Lawrence, of Crick House, Monmouthshire
1870: Edward Lister, of Cefn Ila
1871: Thomas Cerdes Esq. of Bryn Glas, Newport
1872: James Charles Hill Esq. of The Brooks, Abergavenny
1873: John Jefferies Stone, of Scyborwen
1874: Crawshay Bailey, of Maindiff Court, Abergavenny
1875: John Allen Rolls, of The Hendre
1876: Edward Kennard, of Park House, Blaenavon
1877: Charles Henry Crompton-Roberts, of Drybridge House, Monmouth
1878: John Capel Hanbury, of Pontypool Park, Pontypool
1879: James Murray Bannerman, of Wyastone Leys, Herefordshire
1880: Charles Edward Lewis, of Saint Pierre, Chepstow
1881: James Graham, of Hilston Park, Monmouth
1882: Thomas Phillips Price, of Triley Court, Abergavenny
1883: William George Cartwright, of Newport
1884: Richard Powell Rees, of Firs, Abergavenny
1885: George Lawrence Esq. of Trevella
1886: Joseph Firbank, of Saint Julian's, Newport
1887: Edmund Davies Williams, of Maesrudded, Crumlin
1888: Robert William Kennard, of Blaenavon
1889: Joseph Alfred Bradney, of Tal-y-coed Court
1890: Thomas Beynon Esq. of Castleton, Newport
1891: Thomas Firbank, of St. Julians, Newport
1892: William Curre, of Ilton, Chepstow
1893: Arthur Evans, of Llangibby Castle, Monmouthshire
1894: Richard Leyborn of The Firs, Malpas
1895: Henry Hastings Clay, of Piercefield House, Chepstow
1896: Col. Robert Henry Mansel, of Maindiff Court, Abergavenny
1897: Lt. Col. Charles Montagew Crompton-Roberts, of Drybridge House, Monmouth
1898: Samuel Courthorpe Bosanquet of Dingestow Court
1899: Charles William Earle Marsh of St Helens, Newport
1900: The Honourable John MacLean Rolls, of The Hendre (Second Baron Llangattock, 1912)

Served under Edward VII

1901: William Llewellin Esq. of Upton House, Poole, Dorset
1902: Edward Windsor Richards of Plas Llecha, Usk.
1903: Edward Pritchard Martin of Abergavenny
1904: John Davies James, of Myrtle Grove, Blackwood
1905: Sir Clifford John Corey, First Baronet, of Llantarnam Abbey
1906: Charles Herbert Firbank, of Glen Usk, near Caerleon
1907: Col. Charles Thomas Wallace, of Chesterholme, Stow Park, Newport
1908: Edmund William Thome Llewelyn Brewer-Williams Esq. of Maesrydded, Newport
1909: Edward Steer Esq. of Woodlands, Malpas
1910: Isaac Butler, of Panteg House, near Newport

Served under George V

1911: Sir Thomas Edward Watson, 1st Baronet, of Mary's Lodge, Newport
1912: Sir Frederick Mills, 1st Baronet of The Park Ebbw Vale
1913: Llewyllyn Llewylyn of Kings Hill, Newport
1914: William Gwilym Cristar James, of Llan Wysg, Crickhowell
1915: William Royse Lysaght, of Castleford
1916: John Paton, of Waun Wern, Pontypool
1917: Sir John Wyndham Beynon of Bryn Ivor (also Order of St. John of Jerusalem)
1918: Charles Oswald Liddell, of Shirenewton, Chepstow
1919: Gerald Mainwaring Vaughan Hughes, of Chepstow
1920: Sir Leonard Wilkinson Llewelyn, of Maplas Court, Newport
1921: Lieutenant Colonel Sir Henry Webb, 1st Baronet of Llynarthan
1922: Lieutenant Colonel John Charters Kirk, of St. Alberns, Christchurch, Newport. (Died during year of office, 1922. Acting Sheriff, Edward Coulman)
1923: Sir Richard Mathias, of Vaendre Hall, St Mellons
1924: Major Aubery Isaac Rothwell Butler, of Sandleford Priory, Newbury
1925: Captain Charles Crofts Llewellyn Williams of Llanrumney Hall, Llanrumney, Cardiff
1926: Charles Leigh Clay, Piercefield Park, Chepstow (Brother of Henry Hastings Clay, Sheriff 1895)
1927: Lionel Digby Whitehead of Goytre Hall, Abergavenny
1928: Major Albert Addams Williams, of Llangibby Castle, Monmouthshire
1929: William Percival Miles, of Monkstone Rumney
1930: Frederick Phillips, J.P. for County Borough of Newport
1931: Colonel John Evans, of Grouville, Stow Park Circus, Newport
1932: Sir William Henry Seager, Kt of Croft-y-Bwla, Monmouth
1933: Leonard Twiston Davies of Rockfield Park, Monmouth
1934: Major Claude Gilbert Martin of Stow Park Circus, Newport
1935: Edgar John Lewis of Troedy Chiw, Bedwas

Served under Edward VIII

1936: Edward Osborne Bennett of Llanvihangel Court, near Abergavenny

Served under George VI

1937: Frederick Pring Robjent, of Fields House in the County Borough of Newport in the county of Monmouth, Esq. in the Commission of the Peace.
1938: George Leighton Seager, C.B.E. of " Bryn Ivor Hall", Castleton, near Cardiff
1939: Captain Geoffrey Cartland Hugh Crawshay, of Llanfair Court, Abergavenny
1940: Alfred John Davies, of Stow Park Circle, Newport
1941: Arthur James, of Griffithstown, Pontypool, Monmouthshire
1942: Desmond Lysaght, of Castleford, Chepstow
1943: Andrew Norman Phillips, of Newport
1944: Lieutenant-Colonel Horace Cuthbert Rees Thompson, of Oakdene, Llantarnam
1945: Major Thomas Henry Vile, of Kia Ora, Waterloo Road, Newport
1946: Richard Wilson Bartlett, of Boughcliff, Tidenham Chase, Ohepstow
1947: Sydney Augustus Putnam, of Llantarnam Hall, Llantarnam
1948: Edward Wright Bennett, of Llwyndu Court, Abergavenny
1949: Colonel Robert Clifford Lloyd Thomas of The Shrubbery, Stow Hill, Newport
1950: Frank Longueville Dean of Glenusk, Llanhennock, near Newport
1951: Arthur Maynard Chesterfield Jenour of Crossways, Chepstow.
1952: Ernest Elijah Cashmore of Elmscott, Stow Park Circle, Newport.

Served under Elizabeth II
1953: Edward Connor Lysaght of The Conagar, Llandogo, Chepstow.
1954: David Ronald Phillips of Oakdene, Dewsland Park, Newport.
1955: Lieutenant-Colonel John David Griffiths, of The Cottage, Lower Machen.
1956: Colonel Edward Roderick Hill of St. Arvan's Court, Chepstow.
1957: Arthur Smith of Westover, Glasllwch Lane, Newport.
1958: Percy Charles Jones of Glasllwch House, Newport
1959: Rear-Admiral St. John Aldrich Micklethwait, C.B., D.S.O. of Penhein, near Chepstow.
1960: Brigadier Gerald Birdwood Vaughan-Hughes, M.C.,  of Wyelands, Chepstow
1961: John Wade Thomas of Rocklands, Glasllwch Lane, Newport
1962: David Nathan Rocyn-Jones of Cefn Eurwg, St. Mellons.
1963: Colonel Sir (Robert) Godfrey Llewellyn, 1st Baronet, C.B., C.B.E., M.C., T.D. of Tredilion Park, Abergavenny
1964: Colonel Henry Somerset Parnell Hopkinson, O.B.E. of Llanvihangel Court, near Abergavenny
1965: Henry Antony Patrick Clay, E.R.D. of Wyndcliffe Court, near Chepstow
1966: Lieutenant-Colonel Henry Morton Llewellyn, C.B.E. of Llanfair Grange, near Abergavenny
1967: Brian Ford Treverton Jones, of The Knoll, Clytha Park, Newport
1968: John Frederick Lovell, O.B.E. of "Broughton", Clytha Park, Newport
1969: John Graham O'Mahony Meade, of The Glyn Farm, Devauden, Chepstow
1970: Kenneth Roland Taylor, of Lansdown, 13A Ridgeway, Newport
1971: Gwyn Rocyn Jones, of Woodcote House, Five Lanes, Caerwent, near Newport
1972: Robin Arthur Elidyr Herbert, of Llanover, near Abergavenny
1973: Sir William James Cooper Thomas, 2nd Baronet, T.D. of Rockfield Park, Monmouth
1974 onwards - See High Sheriff of Gwent

References

 
History of Monmouthshire
Monmouthshire